Märchen & Mythen ("Fairy Tales & Myths" in German) is the tenth studio album by German band Faun, released on 15 November 2019 through We Love Music, Electrola and Universal Music Group. It is the first full length studio album to feature member Laura Fella, and the last to feature founding member Fiona Frewert (née Rüggeberg).

Reception
Leoni Dowidat of Sonic Seducer described Märchen & Mythen as a success. The critic wrote that it combines lightness and depth in a way that "captivates and delights, enchants and inspires". Sven Kabelitz of laut.de called the album a "cliché bloodbath" with banal lyrics. The song "Aschenbrödel" is based on the theme music from the popular Christmas film Drei Haselnüsse für Achenbrödel, and Kabelitz wrote that it was cynical to release it as a Christmas single. Kabelitz wrote that the promises of early Faun albums like Zaubersprüche and Licht here have been simplified into cheesy and inauthentic "pagan schlager".

Märchen & Mythen entered the German album chart on sixth place on 22 November 2019. It remained on the chart for twelve weeks.

Track listing

Personnel
Faun
 Oliver Satyr – vocals, bouzouki, nyckelharpa, lute, harp, guitar
 Fiona Frewert – vocals, flute, chalumeau, bagpipes, dulcimer
 Rüdiger Maul – drums, percussion
 Niel Mitra – sampler, synthesizer, beats
 Stephan Groth – vocals, hurdy gurdy, cittern
 Laura Fella – vocals, mandola

Guests
 Flo Janoske – violin on track 2 and 10
 Malte Hoyer – vocals on track 10
 Otto Mellies – voice on track 1

Charts

References

2019 albums
Faun (band) albums
Universal Music Germany albums
Music based on fairy tales